Macropoliana cadioui is a moth of the  family Sphingidae. It is known from Eritrea.

References

Macropoliana
Moths described in 2008